Antonio "Tony" Cruz (born October 31, 1971) is an American former professional road bicycle racer from the United States, who last rode for BMC Racing Team.  In 1999 Cruz was the USPRO National Criterium Champion, and became professional. In 2000 he finished 3rd at the USPRO National Championships Criterium  in Downer’s Grove, Illinois.

In 2004 and 2006 Tony Cruz won the Tour de Nez. He also finished fourth on stage 16 of the 2004 Vuelta a España. He is of Mexican American descent.

Major results

1999
1st  United States National Criterium Championships

2000
1st 1 stage, Solano Bicycle Race
1st U.S. Olympic Road Race Trials, Member U.S. Olympic Road Team

2001
1st 1 stage, Tour de Langkawi

2004
1st Tour de Nez
1st 1 stage, Tour de l'Ain

2005
1st Tour de Nez

2006
1st Tour de Nez

References

External links
VeloBios Cruz Profile
Wenzel Coaching Profile
Amgen Tour of California Web
 

1971 births
Living people
American male cyclists
Cyclists at the 2000 Summer Olympics
Olympic cyclists of the United States
Sportspeople from Long Beach, California
American sportspeople of Mexican descent
21st-century American people